Koyra is a census town in the Barasat I CD block in the Barasat Sadar subdivision in the North 24 Parganas district in the Indian state of West Bengal. It is close to Kolkata and also a part of Kolkata Urban Agglomeration.

Geography

Location
Koyra is located at '

Duttapukur police station has jurisdiction over Barasat I CD block.

Area overview
The area covered in the map alongside is largely a part of the north Bidyadhari Plain. located in the lower Ganges Delta. The country is flat. It is a little raised above flood level and the highest ground borders the river channels.54.67% of the people of the densely populated area lives in the urban areas and 45.33% lives in the rural  areas.

Note: The map alongside presents some of the notable locations in the subdivision. All places marked in the map are linked in the larger full screen map.

Demographics
 India census, Koyra had a population of 11,615; of this, 5,789 are male, 5,826 female. It has an average literacy rate of 68.72%, lower than the national average of 74.04%.

Infrastructure
As per the District Census Handbook 2011, Koyra covered an area of 1.5657 km2. It had 6 primary schools, 2 secondary schools and 2 senior secondary schools. The nearest hospital was available 4 km away, the nearest dispensary/ health centre (without any beds) 1 km away, the nearest family welfare centre 8 km away, the nearest maternity and child welfare centre 8 km away and the nearest maternity home 8 km away.

Transport
Karea Kadambagachhi railway station is on the Barasat-Hasnabad line, which is part the Kolkata Suburban Railway railway system.

Koyra is beside the State Highway 2 (locally known as Taki Road).

Healthcare
North 24 Parganas district has been identified as one of the areas where ground water is affected by arsenic contamination.

See also
Map of Barasat I CD Block on Page 393 of District Census Handbook.

References

Cities and towns in North 24 Parganas district